Guppedantha Manasu (transl. Fist sized Heart) is an Indian Telugu-language romantic drama television series airing on Star Maa from 7 December 2020, at 7 p.m. IST from Monday to Saturday. It is also available on Disney+ Hotstar. The main plot of the serial was taken from Bengali language series Mohor which aired on Star Jalsha. It stars Mukesh Gowda, Raksha Gowda, Sai Kiran and Jyoti Rai in lead roles. The story showcases the ups and downs in the life of a brilliant and fiery-tempered professor of a college, when he clashes with his talented yet headstrong student.

Plot 

Rishendra 'Rishi' Bhushan is the young, brilliant and dynamic Managing Director (MD) and Professor at a college, Devendra Bhushan Institute of Science and Technology (DBST) in Hyderabad, which is owned by his family. He is rich, arrogant, hot-tempered, and is hostile towards his mother, Jagathi, due to a misunderstanding that she left him in his childhood because she didn't want him in her life and chose her career over him. Jagathi had left five-year old Rishi to care for her ailing parents, but his envious aunt Devyani poisoned young Rishi's mind against her. Rishi is raised by Devyani and his father, Mahindra, both of whom he loves and respects tremendously. An extremely talented and intelligent student, Rishi becomes a university topper and gold medalist, and starts managing the DBST college. Rishi agrees for an arranged marriage with a friend, Sakshi, but their engagement breaks because Sakshi wants to do a PhD abroad first. Rishi and Jagathi are separated for twenty years, during which she did not try to meet or contact Rishi. While Jagathi remains miserable and profusely misses Rishi, he is both pained and enraged at her for leaving him. 

After twenty years, Rishi's paths cross with Vasudhara 'Vasu', a headstrong and brilliant student from a village, who dreams to become a teacher. Vasu escapes from a forced wedding with Rajiv, her elder sister's evil widower, who convinces Vasu's orthodox father Chakrapani 'Chakram' to let Rajiv marry her for the sake of his motherless child. Jagathi, who is Vasu's former teacher, advises her to leave home and study at her son Rishi's college, DBST. When Rishi learns that Jagathi sent Vasu, he deliberately sets a very difficult admission interview for her, which she passes painstakingly with Mahindra and Jagathi's help. Rishi admits Vasu to DBST and is now her mathematics professor.

Rishi and Vasu's ideologies initially clash at various instances. Vasu doesn't understand Rishi's animosity towards Jagathi, and Rishi slaps Vasudhara for assassinating his character. But Vasu slowly earns Rishi's acceptance, support and favour with her hard work and sincerity. Rishi accompanies Vasu to the 'Youth Icon' contest and motivates her to win. Rishi also saves her multiple times from the lustful conspiracies of Rajiv, who is later jailed by SI Sireesh, Vasu's childhood friend. Jagathi comes up with a project called 'Mission Education', which Rishi agrees to lead at his college, and eventually acquires Government support for it. He reluctantly employs Jagathi as a professor at DBST and recruits Vasudhara as his project assistant. Rishi, Vasudhara and Jagathi work together to make Mission Education a grand success. Mahindra, Vasu and Jagathi try hard to get Rishi to forgive and reunite with Jagathi, but he continues to reject her as his mother.

As Rishi and Vasudhara spend time together, they start developing feelings for each other. Vasudhara hallucinates Rishi's presence everywhere and longs for his support, while Rishi grows possessive of her and dislikes her spending time with her friend Sireesh. To make Rishi reveal his feelings for Vasu, Mahindra misleads Rishi into thinking that Vasu is about to marry Sireesh. But instead, Rishi grows furious at Vasu for hiding things from him, avoids her, and fires her from the post of his assistant. A hurt Vasu tries hard to ask an unyielding Rishi what her mistake is and why he is angry with her. Finally, desperate, she stands for hours in the rain before Rishi relents and confronts her about marrying Sireesh. Vasu emotionally reveals that she isn't engaged to Sireesh, and begs Rishi to scold her all he wants, but not punish her by being distant or ignoring her. Rishi becomes friendly with Vasu again.

Rishi's friend Gautam comes from USA to stay with him, and to Rishi's annoyance, harbours feelings for Vasu. Against Devyani's wishes, Rishi reluctantly brings Jagathi to his house to celebrate Makar Sankranti for Mahindra's happiness, after Mahindra suffers from a stroke. Devayani's ploy to insult Jagathi makes Mahendra publicly reveal that Jagathi is Rishi's mother and his wife. Rishi's anger at this causes Jagathi and Mahindra to move out of Rishi's house. Jagathi informs Rishi that Mahindra's health is suffering as he misses Rishi. To Devyani's horror, Rishi brings Jagathi back home again after 22 years to live together with Mahindra, as a birthday gift for him. Vasu continually admires and appreciates Rishi's stellar character. Her concern for Rishi and eagerness to make him happy attract him to her. A proud Jagathi is constantly appreciated for Rishi's professional and personal virtues. Vasu rejects Gautam when he proposes to her. Sakshi returns, pausing her PhD to win Rishi back with Devyani's help, but is rejected vehemently by a furious Rishi.

After deep thought, Rishi realizes and confesses his love for Vasu, but is stunned to know that she does not love him and does not believe his love for her, because he rejected both Jagathi and Sakshi in the past. Rishi resolves to stay away from Vasu, but she hallucinates him everywhere and can't concentrate in class or her part-time job. She makes several unsuccessful attempts to talk and apologize to Rishi, prays profusely for him when he meets with a road accident, plans a grand welcome for him in college when he recovers, gives him all her food despite being hungry, and realizes that she would die without Rishi when he risks his life to save his students during a chemistry lab accident. Vasu regrets not accepting Rishi's proposal, publicly credits Rishi for her academic success and garlands him with flowers, feels jealous seeing him with Sakshi and vows to win him back, but is afraid to propose lest Rishi slap her and reject her in anger. When Sakshi publicly proposes marriage to Rishi at a college event, Devyani begs a furious Rishi to marry her for their reputation. But Rishi forces Sakshi to call off their wedding with his deliberate negligence and open interest in Vasudhara. Vasu apologizes to Rishi and emotionally confesses her love to him with a ring with their initials 'R' and 'V'. Rishi gracefully accepts Vasu's proposal on the condition that in his love, she won't neglect her education and career. Rishi rescues Vasu from Sakshi's evil plot to prevent Vasu from writing her final examinations, and scares Sakshi into fleeing the city by threatening to get her arrested. Vasu ranks first in the University and dedicates her success to Rishi and Jagathi.

Rishi slowly develops a positive impression on Jagathi as he observes her good understanding of him and the similarity in their thoughts. Rishi grandly celebrates his parents' wedding anniversary for Mahindra's happiness. Mahindra and Vasudhara clash with an irritated Rishi in a bid to convince him to accept Jagathi as his mother. Triggered by Devyani, Mahindra and Jagathi leave Rishi's house for his happiness, but Rishi brings them back. Mahindra and Vasudhara apologize to Rishi for hurting him with their stubbornness. When Jagathi meets with a road accident, Rishi saves her life by donating blood to her and takes great care of her. Rishi recruits Vasu to work at DBST for the Mission Education efforts. Devyani cunningly misrepresents Rishi's closeness with Vasu and maligns her character publicly. But Rishi protects Vasu by declaring her as his fiancee. Rishi takes Vasu to her parents' house to fix their marriage, where Rajeev blackmails a terrified Vasu that he will kill Rishi if she does not marry him. Unknown to Rishi, a desperate Vasu imagines her marriage with him, wears a mangalasutra (nuptial chain) in his name and declares herself as Rishi's wife to her family, to save herself from marrying Rajeev. An angry Rajeev assaults Vasu's parents, who are saved by Rishi, and gets Vasu arrested under false charges of attempting to murder her parents to marry Rishi. Fearing that Rajeev will harm Rishi next, an anguished Vasu refuses help from Rishi to get out of prison and misleads him that she has married Rajeev. A stunned and hurt Rishi leaves. Vasu's parents recover and close the case against her by testifying against Rajeev. Vasu returns to DBST college to win back Rishi's love and trust.

Rishi and his family are furious at Vasudhara for having insulted and betrayed him. Vasu deeply regrets hurting Rishi, calls, texts, and goes to meet him several times a day, happily takes the flowers that Rishi offers God at a temple, gives Rishi a head massage, prays for him to accept her back and requests him repeatedly to guide her in the Mission Education work. Rishi ignores Vasu thinking that she married Rajeev, but saves her from a road accident, provides her accommodation as a college employee, protects her from his family's harsh words, and supports her in her work when she is neglected by everyone in the college for hurting Rishi. Rishi gets Rajeev arrested for harassing Vasu in college, and learns from the police that Rajeev did not marry her. Vasu's informal familiarity with Rishi, the importance she gives him and his memories, and his name written everywhere in her bedroom make Rishi realize that there is no one in her life except him. Rishi lashes out at a tensed and scared Vasu for hiding the truth about her marriage from him, carelessly portraying herself as a married woman despite being unmarried, and risking the sanctity of their relationship in society. To save Vasu from public humiliation by Devyani, Rishi declares their marriage in front of the media, but firmly tells Vasu in private that they are not married and he does not consider her his wife. Vasu realizes her mistakes and comes to stay at Rishi's house. She takes care of Rishi and his family and tries to make him happy, to earn his forgiveness and his acceptance of her as his wife.

Cast

Main Cast 

 Mukesh Gowda as Rishendra Bhushan aka Rishi: Managing Director of DBST college; Gold medalist in mathematics; Jagathi and Mahendra's son; Phanindra and Devyani's foster son; Vasu's mathematics professor, mentor, employer and love interest; Ravindra and Suhasini's nephew; Shailendra, Anju and Sanju's cousin; Gautam's best friend; Dharani's cousin brother-in-law (Main Protagonist)
 Raksha Gowda as Vasudhara aka Vasu: Rishi's student, mentee, employee and love interest; Jagathi's former student; Chakrapani and Sumitra's daughter; Vandana and Madhavi's younger sister (Main Protagonist)
 Sai Kiran as Mahendra Bhushan: Rishi's father; Board member at DBST college; Jagathi's husband; Phanindra and Ravindra's brother; Shailendra, Anju and Sanju's uncle (Protagonist)
 Jyothi Rai as Jagathi Mahendra Bhushan: Rishi's mother and employee at DBST college; Gold medalist in Mathematics; Vasu's former mathematics professor; Mahendra's wife; Shailendra, Anju and Sanju's aunt (Protagonist)
 Madhavi Vootla as Devayani Phanindra Bhushan: Rishi's aunt and foster mother; Phanindra's wife; Mahindra's sister-in-law; Shailendra's mother; Dharani's mother-in-law (Main Antagonist)

Recurring Cast 
 Kiran Kanth as Gautham: Rishi's best friend
 Nava Bharath Balaji as Phanindra Bhushan: Rishi's uncle; Patriarch of the Bhushan family; Devyani's husband; Mahendra and Ravindra's elder brother; Shailendra's father; Dharani's father-in-law
 Jyothi Poornima (2020-2022)/Seetha Mahalakshmi (2022-present) as Dharani Shailendra Bhushan: Rishi's cousin sister-in-law; Shailendra's wife; Devayani and Phanindra's daughter-in-law 
 Vasanthi (2020-2021)/Rasagnya Ritu (2022-present) as Sakshi: Rishi's former fiancée (Antagonist)
 Gopal Shyam as Rajiv: Vasu and Madhavi's brother-in-law; Vandhana's widower; Vishalakshi's son (Antagonist)
 Srinidhi as Pushpa: Rishi's student at DBST college; Vasu's classmate and best friend 
 Sudheer Challa as Ravindra Bhushan: Rishi's uncle; Suhasini's husband; Sanju and Anju's father; Mahendra and Phanindra's younger brother 
 Vanitha as Suhasini Ravindra Bhushan: Rishi's aunt; Ravindra's wife; Sanju and Anju's mother 
 Veena Swaroopa as Anjana "Anju" Bhushan: Rishi's cousin; Sanju's twin sister; Ravindra and Suhasini's daughter 
 VJ Roshini as Sanjana "Sanju" Bhushan: Rishi's cousin: Anju's twin sister; Ravindra and Suhasini's daughter 
 Aparna as Madhavi: Vasu and Vandhana's sister; Chakrapani and Sumitra's daughter; Vikas's wife  
 Adarsh as SI Sireesh: Vasu's friend
 Balaji as Chakrapani "Chakram": Vasu, Madhavi and Vandhana's father; Sumitra's husband 
 Ushashri as Sumitra: Vasu, Madhavi and Vandhana's mother; Chakrapani's wife 
 Uma Shankar as Vikas: Madhavi's husband; Vasu's brother-in-law 
 Uma Naidu as Vasu, Madhavi and Vandhana's aunt; Chakrapani's elder sister 
 Gayathri Alluri as Vishalakshi: Rajiv's mother 
 Bhargavi as Vandhana: Vasu and Madhavi's late elder sister; Rajiv's late wife; Chakrapani and Sumitra's late daughter (Posthumous presence in photographs)

Adaptations

Reception 
The pair of Rishi and Vasudhara, fondly called by fans as 'Rishidhara', is immensely loved and tremendously popular among audiences of all age groups. 
 
In September 2022, Guppedantha Manasu became the top GEC show in Telugu television in both Urban and Rural ratings, breaking the 221-week long first place record of the Star Maa serial, Karthika Deepam. Guppedantha Manasu has also enjoyed the position of the most popular Telugu show, as well as the top viewed show across the whole of India, online on Disney+Hotstar beginning from 2021. Guppedantha Manasu was the seventh most watched show on TV in the whole of India across all languages, in 2022. 

In June 2022, Guppedantha Manasu became the top show in terms of Urban ratings and the top 2 GEC show overall for the Telugu audience, and has remained so ever since. In February 2022, the show became a top 3 show in both Telugu GEC and Star Maa. In November 2021 and December 2021, the show received its highest ever ratings of 14+ TRP points.

References

External links 

 Guppendatha Manasu on Disney+ Hotstar

Indian television soap operas
Serial drama television series
2020 Indian television series debuts
Telugu-language television shows
Indian drama television series
Star Maa original programming
Television shows set in Andhra Pradesh